Foxy Festival ("Festival") is a 2010 South Korean film with an all-star ensemble cast. It is a character-driven comedy of manners about the discreet sexual lives of a group of interconnected people in an upper-middle class district of Seoul.

Plot
Loose cannon Kwak Jang-bae (Shin Ha-kyun), a neighborhood policeman, is obsessed with his sexual prowess and continually wants to have sex with his live-in girlfriend, Ji-su (Uhm Ji-won), an English teacher at a private school who is bored with his macho behavior. Forthright high-school student Ju Ja-hye (Baek Jin-hee) sells her sweat-stained panties on the internet and wants to lose her virginity to scruffy fish-sausage seller Choi-kang Sang-du (Ryoo Seung-bum); the older man is uninterested in her advances but Ja-hye cannot work out why. Ja-hye's mother (Shim Hye-jin), who sells hanbok (traditional Korean female dress), discovers the owner of a hardware shop opposite, Gi-bong (Sung Dong-il), is into S&M and starts having sessions with him in the back of his shop, assuming a dominatrix role. Kim Gwang-rok (Oh Dal-su), Ja-hye's teacher, is a married man who is secretly into wearing women's clothes when his wife is not around. When Jang-bae discovers Ji-su has ordered a vibrator, he has a major crisis over his manhood and stops sleeping with her. Meanwhile, as his neighborhood has been marked for a moral clean-up campaign by the police, it's only time before Jang-bae also bumps heads with its denizens' licentious goings-on.

Cast
Shin Ha-kyun ... Kwak Jang-bae, policeman
Uhm Ji-won ... Ji-su, Jang-bae's girlfriend
Shim Hye-jin .... Ju Seon-shim, hanbok shop owner
Sung Dong-il ... Gi-bong, hardware shop owner
Ryoo Seung-bum ... Choi-kang Sang-du, fish-sausage hawker
Baek Jin-hee ... Ja-hye, Seon-shim's daughter
Oh Dal-su ... Kim Gwang-rok, teacher
Choi Kwon ... In-su
Mun Se-yun ... Deok-gu
Jo Gyeong-suk ... Gwang-rok's wife
Oh Yun-hong ... flower-shop lady
Kim Tae-jong ... hairdresser
Kim Ah-joong ... air doll (cameo)
Han Sang-jin ... delivery man
Park So-hyeon

References

External links
 https://web.archive.org/web/20130826203752/http://www.festival2010.co.kr/
 Foxy Festival at Twitter
 
 

South Korean sex comedy films
2010 films
2010 romantic comedy films
Films directed by Lee Hae-young
Films set in Seoul
2010s South Korean films
2010s Korean-language films